The longfin spotted snake eel (Myrichthys aspetocheiros) is an eel in the family Ophichthidae (worm/snake eels). It was described by John E. McCosker and Richard Heinrich Rosenblatt in 1993. It is a marine, tropical eel which is known from Mexico, Costa Rica and Panama, in the eastern central Pacific Ocean.

Due to its moderately widespread distribution in the eastern Pacific, lack of known threats, and lack of observed population decline, the IUCN redlist currently lists the Longfin spotted snake-eel as Least Concern.

References

longfin spotted snake-eel
Western Central American coastal fauna
longfin spotted snake-eel